Chris Timons (born 8 December 1974) is an English professional footballer who plays as defender and midfielder for Rainworth Miners Welfare.

Career
His previous clubs include Clipstone Miners Welfare, Mansfield Town, Halifax Town, Chesterfield, Leyton Orient, Stafford Rangers, Gainsborough Trinity, Altrincham, Stalybridge Celtic, Ilkeston Town, Harrogate Town and Rainworth MW.

In September 2007, he was appointed caretaker manager of Hucknall Town following the resignation of Andy Legg. His only game in charge was a defeat at Burscough F.C. He left Hucknall Town for Ilkeston Town in summer 2008 but returned to Watnall Road in September 2008.

References

External links

Living people
Clipstone F.C. players
Mansfield Town F.C. players
Gainsborough Trinity F.C. players
Chesterfield F.C. players
Halifax Town A.F.C. players
Leyton Orient F.C. players
Altrincham F.C. players
Ilkeston Town F.C. (1945) players
Stalybridge Celtic F.C. players
Hucknall Town F.C. players
Harrogate Town A.F.C. players
Glapwell F.C. players
Stafford Rangers F.C. players
Rainworth Miners Welfare F.C. players
Shirebrook Town F.C. players
English football managers
Hucknall Town F.C. managers
Northern Premier League players
1974 births
Association football defenders
Association football midfielders
English footballers
East Midlands Counties Football League players
Northern Counties East Football League players